Puccinia striiformis var. striiformis is a plant pathogen. It causes stripe rust on wheat, but has other hosts as well. The species is common in Europe and in more recent years has become a problem in Australia. Infection can cause losses of up to 40%, and the fungus will infect both winter wheat and spring wheat.
The taxonomy of Puccinia striiformis was revised in 2010. The commonly called stripe rusts on wheat and grasses were separated into four species based on molecular and morphological studies: Puccinia striiformis sensu stricto (on Aegilops, Elymus, Hordeum and Triticum spp.), Puccinia pseudostriiformis (on Poa spp.), Puccinia striiformoides (on Dactylis spp.) and Puccinia gansensis (on Achnatherum spp.)

The stripe rust, Puccinia striiformis, can greatly decrease wheat yield in northern Punjab and Khyber Pakhtunkhwa (NWFP).

See also 
 Wheat yellow rust
 List of Puccinia species

References

External links 
 Index Fungorum
 USDA ARS Fungal Database

Fungal plant pathogens and diseases
Wheat diseases
striiformis var. striiformis
Fungi described in 1854